Choi Yan-chi (born 1949) is "one of few veteran female artists in Hong Kong."

Biography

Early Years 
She was born in Hong Kong in 1949, and received education in the city. She graduated in 1969 from Northcote College of Education and in 1970 from Grantham College of Education. After having her first solo show at the American Library in 1972,  she attended Columbus College of Art and Design in 1973, and then the School of the Art Institute of Chicago from 1974 to 1976. She obtained MFA from the same school in 1978.

Career 
Choi began teaching at Hong Kong Polytechnic Swire School of Design, the University of Hong Kong and the Chinese University of Hong Kong in 1979. She had her first participation in performance in 1980, at an experimental theatre performance by The Hong Kong Art Centre called "Journey to China"(中國旅程).

Afterwards, she participated in stage design for Parting at River Yi (易水送別), Othello (嫉) and Fu (負), before retreating from full-time teaching in 1986. She participated in an RTHK 13-week television art magazine program called 流光聚影 in 1988. Then, she resided in New York and Toronto in the 1990s, and returned to Hong Kong in 1997.

In 1998, she received fundings from Hong Kong Arts Development Council to start 1a space, a non-profit-making art space. She also resumed full-time teaching in the same year, in the Institute of Vocational Education. Afterwards, she moved on to the Hong Kong Baptist University.

In 2011, Choi was granted an award by the Hong Kong Secretary of Home Affairs’ Commendation Scheme.

Selected exhibitions

Group exhibitions 
 “Landscape”, HK Cultural Center; 2000.
 “Contemporary Hong Kong Art”, HK Biennial 雙年展, Hong Kong Museum of Art; 2001.
 “Home Affair” 家事展, HK Heritage Museum at Sam Tung Uk Gallery; 1999.
 “Bad Rice” show 歪米展, Next Wave Festival, Melbourne, Australia; 1998.
 “Bad Rice” show 歪米展, Damen Art Foundation, Taipei, Taiwan; 1999.
 “Hong Kong Festival” 香港藝術節, Munich, Germany; 1997.
 “River” 河流展︰新亞洲藝術對話在台北, Taipei. Taiwan; 1997.
 “City at the end of time”, Vancouver, Canada; 1997.
 “Journey to China” 中國旅程 Center for the Arts, HK University of Science and Technology; 1997.
 City Vibrance 城市變奏, Hong Kong Museum of Art; 1992.
 “Turn of the Decade” 轉變的年代, Hong Kong Arts Centre; 1989.
 “Out of Context”, on a mansion on Kennedy Road organised by Hong Kong Arts Centre 1988. ”10 Years of Hong Kong Paintings”’ 香港十年繪畫展, Hong Kong Arts Center; 1985.
 “Into the 80's” 八十年代–香港繪畫. Hong Kong Arts Center; 1984.

Solo Shows 
 Red Head Gallery, Toronto, Canada; 1996.
 Mercer Union, Toronto, Canada; 1994.
 Haus der Kulturen der Welt, Berlin, Germany; 1993.
 ”The First Asia-Pacific Triennial” 第一屆亞太三年展, Queensland Art Gallery, Australia; 1993.
 Asia American Arts Center, New York; 1991.
 “An extension into spaced” 空間內外, (the first exhibition of installation works in Hong Kong), Hong Kong Arts Centre in 1985.
 From the Wall to the Floor, Hong Kong Arts Center; 1979.

Solo Retrospective 
 [Re-]Fabrication - A Research-based Exhibition on Choi Yan-chi’s 30 Years: Paths for Inter –Disciplinarity in Art (1975-2005), curated by Linda Chiu-han Lai, 11 Nov - 23 Dec, 2006, Para Site, Hong Kong. A parallel exhibition, {Re-]Vision, was held at 1a on 1–29 November 2006. The duet-exhibition was accompanied by a 332-page catalogue with the same title as the exhibition, published by Para Site.

Performance 
 1980 Journey to the East, Part III 中國旅程三, presented by the Hong Kong Arts Centre
 1988 As Slow as Possible 慢之極, presented by Hong Kong Regional Council
 1989 Object-activi-ties 東西遊戲, presented by Hong Kong Institute for the Promotion of Chinese Culture
 1991 Melting 溶, presented by Hong Kong Goethe-Institut for Joseph Beuy’s exhibition, Hong Kong Arts Centre

Curated Shows 
 1996 Beyond the Stock Market and Kungfu Movie: Hong Kong Art, an introduction in Toronto, presented by Hong Kong Trade & Economic Office in Canada
 1998 Paintings in Hong Kong 繪畫香港
 2002 Behind the Eyeball
 2003 Tree-Man: retrospectives of Danny Yung〈樹．人〉(榮念曾回顧展), presented by 1a Space

Consultancy 
 1998 Co-founder, Chairperson, board of directors, 1a Space.
 1998-04 [ending year needs verification] Chairperson, 1a Space (non-profit Art Space funded by Hong Kong Arts Development Council).
 1999 Co-op member, Hong Kong Arts Development Council, Visual Arts Section
 2002 Steering Group, Venice Biennial - Hong Kong, Hong Kong Arts Development Council
 2003 Adjudicator, Hong Kong Art Biennial, Hong Kong Museum of Art

Grants and awards

Hong Kong 
 1989-91 C.I.T.I.C. Grant of Asia Cultural Council. Artist-in-residence (New York) and travel in the U.S.
 1990 Visiting Artist Grant; British Council to travel England
 1998 “Artist of the Year”, Hong Kong Arts Development Council

Overseas 
 1976 Fellowship Show, the School of the Art Institute of Chicago, awarded and sponsored by the Art Institute of Chicago (Museum)
 1989-90 CITIC Fellowship, Artist-in-residence in New York and travel in US, Asian Cultural Council
 1990 Artist-in-residence, Yellow Spring Art Institute, Penn, U.S.A.
 1992 Artist-in-residence, ‘Heinrich-Boll-Stiftung’ Grant, Berlin, Germany
 1993 Travel Grant, Canada Council, Canada
 1994 B Grant (for artists with achievement), Canada Council, Canada
 1994 Visual Artist Grant, Artist-in-residence, Ontario Art Council, Canada
 1995 Visual Artist Grant, Artist-in-education, Ontario Art Council, Canada
 1996 Travel Grant, Canada Council, Canada
 1996 Visual Artist Grant, Artist-in-education, Ontario Art Council, Canada

Publications 
 1992 “Contemporary Asia Arts Conference”, Asia Society, New York.
 1998 “Space and Passion, the art of Hon Chi-Fun”, partially funded by Hong Kong Arts Development Council
 2003 “Art Education and Visual Culture,” HKSEA (Society of Education in Art).
 2006 [Re-]Fabrication: Choi Yan-chi's30 years, paths of inter-disciplinarity in art; researched and edited by Linda Chiu-han Lai, supported by Hong Kong Arts Development Council; part of the "Hong Kong Artists in the 1980s" series, Para Site Art Space.

Invitations to International Program 
 1992 “Contemporary Asia Arts Conference,” a paper presented in the first conference by Asia Society, New York.
 1992 ‘Global Forum on Human survival and the Arts’ – an international conference on the issues of arts and environmental protection in Shimane, Japan.
 1993 The First Asian Pacific Triennial, Queensland Art Gallery

Teachings 
 Assistant Professor, Academy of Visual Arts, HK Baptist University, 2005–.
 Lecturer, HK Baptist University, Department of Music and Fine Arts; 2003–2005.
 Lecturer, Institute of Vocational Education. Design Department; 1998–2003.
 Part-time Lecturer, Hong Kong University. Department of Fine Art 1984–1993.
 Lecturer, Hong Kong Polytechnic, Swire School of Design; 1978-1986.

References 

Living people
1949 births
20th-century women artists
Columbus College of Art and Design alumni
Hong Kong artists
Hong Kong women artists
School of the Art Institute of Chicago alumni